Braddock's Defeat: The Battle of the Monongahela and the Road to Revolution is a 2015 book by David L. Preston and published by Oxford University Press.

Awards
It was the 2015 recipient of the Guggenheim-Lehrman Prize in Military History.

It was also the 2016 recipient of the Distinguished Book Award from the Society for Military History.

References

2015 non-fiction books
Books about the American Revolution
Works about the French and Indian War
Oxford University Press books